Buena Vista was a Yokuts dialect of California.

The dialect was "formerly spoken in at least two local varieties around Buena Vista Lake in Kern County, California," in the villages of Hometwoli, Loasau, Tuhohi, and Tulamni.

Dialects 

Two documented dialects of Buena Vista were Tulamni and Hometwali. Tuhohi (also called Tohohai or Tuhohayi) was a similar dialect, spoken by a tribe who "lived among channels and sloughs of Kern River where they enter Tulare Lake."

A variety of the Barbareño language "was heavily influenced by Buena Vista Yokuts." This language was called Emigdiano, as it was "spoken at San Emigdio near Buena Vista Lake."

References

External links 
 Buena Vista Yokuts at the California Language Archive

Yokutsan languages
Extinct languages of North America
Languages extinct in the 1930s